Miscanthus sinensis, the eulalia or Chinese silver grass, is a species of flowering plant in the grass family Poaceae, native to eastern Asia throughout most of China, Japan, Taiwan and Korea.

Description
The flowers are purplish, held above the foliage. This plant is the preferred structure for the nesting of some species of paper wasps, such as Ropalidia fasciata.

Nomenclature
The Latin specific epithet sinensis means "from China", though the plant is found elsewhere in eastern Asia.

Forms and varieties
M. sinensis f. glaber Honda
M. sinensis var. gracillimus Hitchc.
M. sinensis var. variegatus Beal
M. sinensis var. zebrinus Beal

Cultivation
It is widely cultivated as an ornamental plant in temperate climates around the world.

It has become an invasive species in parts of North America.  However, it is possible to reduce the likelihood of escape or hybridization with extant wild M. sinensis populations with breeding and proper management.

Cultivars
Several cultivars have been selected, including 'Strictus' with narrow growth habit, 'Variegata' with white margins, and ‘Zebrinus’ (sometimes incorrectly rendered as 'Zebrina') with horizontal yellow and green stripes across the leaves. Those marked  have gained the Royal Horticultural Society's Award of Garden Merit. 

'Border Bandit'
'Cosmopolitan'  
'Dronning Ingrid'
'Ferner Osten'  
'Flamingo'  
'Gewitterwolke'  
'Ghana'  
'Gold und Silber'  
'Gracillimus'
'Grosse Fontäne'  
'Kaskade'  
'Kleine Fontäne'  
'Kleine Silberspinne'  
'Malepartus'
'Morning Light'  
'Septemberrot'  
'Silberfeder'  
'Strictus'  
'Undine'  
'Variegatus'
'Zebrinus'

Uses
M. sinensis is a candidate for bioenergy production due to its high yield, even in high stress environments, easy propagation, effective nutrient cycling, and high genetic variation.

Synonyms
Eulalia japonica Trin. 
Saccharum japonicum Thunb.

Gallery

References

External links

 Photos of Miscanthus sinensis: seasonal/color change
Flora of China: Miscanthus sinensis
Virginia Cooperative Extension: Miscanthus sinensis 'Stricta'

sinensis
Grasses of China
Grasses of Russia
Flora of tropical Asia
Flora of Japan
Flora of Korea
Flora of the Russian Far East
Flora of Taiwan
Garden plants of Asia
Plants described in 1855